Baireni is a village development committee in Dhading District in the Bagmati Zone of central Nepal. At the time of the 1991 Nepal census, it had a population of 11,821.

References

Populated places in Dhading District